Hitkarini College of Engineering and Technology (abbreviated HCET or HCET Jabalpur) is a private technical institute located in Jabalpur, India. It is the second-oldest private engineering institute of the Mahakoshal region. It is a subsidiary of a historic educational society, the Hitkarini Sabha. The college is affiliated to the Rajiv Gandhi Technical University, Bhopal and All India Council for Technical Education, New Delhi.

Campus
In 2000, HCET shifted from its old campus to a new campus building, which is located on top of a hill (now known as Hitkarini Hills) just  from the Jabalpur Airport (also known as Dumna Airport). Since then, HCET has the largest infrastructure among the private Engineering institutes of Jabalpur. The college has a Central Library having more than 20,000 books. HCET is located in "Dumna" close to IIITDM Jabalpur, University of Jabalpur and the College of Material Management, Jabalpur. "Dumna" area is a popular sub-urban hilly area in Jabalpur because of its natural greenery and the Dumna Nature Reserve Park. The college campus houses a separate building for the Hitkarini Dental College and Hospital and shares its own part of the infrastructure with the Hitkarini College of Architecture and Town Planning, both being the child institutes of the same governing organization, the Hitkarini Sabha.

Courses
HCET Jabalpur has 10 departments and an engineering workshop. The academic departments in HCET Jabalpur include the following:
 Engineering Chemistry
 Engineering Mathematics
 Engineering Physics
 Civil Engineering
 Computer Science & Engineering
 Electrical Engineering
 Electronics & Communication Engineering
 Humanities
 Information Technology
 Mechanical Engineering

References

External links
 Official Website
 Hitkarini Sabha's Website
 AICTE KnowYourCollege Website

Engineering colleges in Madhya Pradesh
Education in Jabalpur